Fawaz Al-Shammari (born 3 April 1977 in Kuwait City) is a Kuwaiti hurdler. He competed at the 2012 Summer Olympics.

Competition record

References 

1977 births
Living people
Sportspeople from Kuwait City
Kuwaiti male hurdlers
Olympic athletes of Kuwait
Athletes (track and field) at the 2012 Summer Olympics
Athletes (track and field) at the 2006 Asian Games
Athletes (track and field) at the 2010 Asian Games
Asian Games competitors for Kuwait
20th-century Kuwaiti people
21st-century Kuwaiti people